Louis Charles de Bourbon, Count of Eu (October 15, 1701 – July 13, 1775) was a grandson of Louis XIV of France and his maîtresse-en-titre Madame de Montespan. He was the last member of the legitimised house of [[Bourbon du Maine|Maine branch of the House of Bourbon]], a legitimised, cadet branch of the Capetian dynasty

Life
Born at his parents' château de Sceaux near Versailles on October 15, 1701, he was the youngest son of Louis Auguste de Bourbon, Duke of Maine, and his wife, Anne Louise Bénédicte de Bourbon.

He grew up with his elder brother, Louis Auguste de Bourbon, Prince of Dombes and his younger sister Louise Françoise de Bourbon (1707–1743), known as Mademoiselle du Maine.

Like his siblings he remained unmarried and childless all his life. On his father's death in 1736 he gained the title of Duke of Aumale. He was also made Grand Master of the Artillery. a post that his father had also held.

His elder brother was their father's main heir, but when he was killed in a duel in 1755 Louis Charles inherited his brother's estate. He was given his brother's governorship of Languedoc and inherited his brother's many châteaux.

Like his elder brother he was little seen at court and preferred to hunt on his estate of the Château d'Anet.

In March 1762 he exchanged with Louis XV the principality of the Dombes for the dukedoms of Gisors and the estates of Gretz-Armainvilliers and Pontcarré.

Like his cousin, Louis Jean Marie de Bourbon, Duke of Penthièvre, Louis Charles was popular as a result of his charitable donations. In 1773 he offered to sell the dukedom of Aumale, countship of Eu and the estate of Anet to Louis XV for 12 million livres''.

Louis Charles died at Sceaux at the age of 73 in October 1775. As he was childless, he made his younger cousin the Duke of Penthièvre, son of Louis Alexandre de Bourbon, Count of Toulouse, his heir.

Ancestry

Footnotes

1700 births
1775 deaths
Princes of the Dombes
Counts of Dreux
House of Bourbon-Maine
Dukes of Aumale